The scarlet-banded barb (Puntius amphibius) is a species of ray-finned fish in the genus Puntius. It is found in streams in India and Sri Lanka.

References 

amphibius
Taxa named by Achille Valenciennes
Fish described in 1842
Barbs (fish)